Prime Commercial Bank Limited is a commercial bank in Nepal. The bank is an ‘A’ class commercial bank licensed by Nepal Rastra Bank and has branches all across the nation with its head office in Kathmandu which provides entire commercial banking services.

The bank's shares are publicly traded as an 'A' category company in the Nepal Stock Exchange.

Correspondent network
The bank has been maintaining harmonious correspondent relationships with various international banks from various countries to facilitate trade, remittance and other cross border services. Through these correspondents the bank is able to provide services in any major currencies in the world.

Network

See also

 List of banks in Nepal
 Commercial Banks of Nepal

References

External links
 Official Website of Prime Commercial Bank Limited
 Official Website of Nepal Rastra Bank

Banks of Nepal
Banks with year of establishment missing